The Église Notre-Dame-de-Confort (Church of Our Lady of Comfort) was a church in the French city of Lyon, near Place des Jacobins, where a plaque marks its site.

History

Founded in 1218, the church was under Dominican control and used by the city's large Florentine community as their national church. In 1464 they won the right to bury their dead there and they provided most of the money for its improvement and expansion.

In 1517 Bartolomeo Panciantichi was the first to add a chapel to the church. He commissioned an oil on panel altarpiece of the Assumption of the Virgin Mary for it in 1522 from Andrea del Sarto, but the artist chose a poor piece of wood and the work remained incomplete and never exhibited in Lyon. In 1526 Thomas I de Gadagne donated the cost of another chapel, where he and his wife were later buried. His nephew and heir Thomas II commissioned Francesco Salviati to paint a work for it showing The Incredulity of Saint Thomas. The banker Leonardo Spiza added a mausoleum to the church, as did another Florentine who commissioned Antonio Rossellino to design it. The church was demolished in 1816, though the entrance arch to one of its chapels can still be seen at 8-10 rue de Sully, where it was reused after the church's demolition.

References

Sources

Further reading

Abbé Adolphe Vachet, À travers les rues de Lyon, Marseille, Laffitte Reprints, 1982 (1re éd. 1902), 500 p.
Fontalirant, Notre-Dame-de-Confort : sanctuaire des frères prêcheurs à Lyon, 1218-1791
Levesque, Les Frères prêcheurs de Lyon Notre-Dame-de-Confort, 1218-1789
Federica Carta, « La cappella Panciatichi in Notre-Dame de Confort a lione », Prospettiva, 2015

Roman Catholic churches in Lyon
Former churches in France